John (Johan) Sandgren (1883 Roslagen - 17 October 1932, Chicago) was a Swedish syndicalist active in Sweden and the United States. He was editor of The One Big Union Monthly and The Industrial Pioneer, publications of the Industrial Workers of the World.

In 1909 he visited the USA on behalf of the 1909 Swedish general strike.

During the 1920s he supported himself through working for a translation agency which he had established.

Works

Translations:
 Varför jag är syndikalist (Why I am A Syndicalist) by Tom Mann translated into Swedish
 The IWW Needs an Industrial Encyclopedia, The One Big Union Monthly, November 1919 pp. 42–44

References

Swedish trade unionists
Syndicalists
1883 births
1932 deaths
Swedish expatriates in the United States